William Ua Cellaig (modern ), also known as William Boy O'Kelly or William Buí Ó Ceallaigh, was Taoiseach of Uí Maine and Chief of the Name. He died c.1381. 

On Christmas Day, 1351, Ó Ceallaigh invited poets, artists, and writers from across Ireland to a feast in his home. The feast became famous for the hospitality Ó Ceallaigh showed to his guests, and "" (literally: We got the O'Kelly welcome) remains a description for hospitable hosts in contemporary Irish.

References

 The Tribes and customs of Hy-Many, John O'Donovan, 1843
 The Surnames of Ireland, Edward MacLysaght, Dublin, 1978.
 The Anglo-Normans in Co. Galway: the process of colonization, Patrick Holland, Journal of the Galway Archaeological and Historical Society, vol. 41,(1987-88)
 Excavation on the line of the medieval town defences of Loughrea, Co. Galway, J.G.A.& H.S., vol. 41, (1987-88)
 Anglo-Norman Galway; rectangular earthworks and moated sites, Patrick Holland, J.G.A. & H.S., vol. 46 (1993)
  Rindown Castle: a royal fortress in Co. Roscommon, Sheelagh Harbison, J.G.A. & H.S., vol. 47 (1995)
 The Anglo-Norman landscape in County Galway; land-holdings, castles and settlements, Patrick Holland, J.G.A.& H.S., vol. 49 (1997)
 Annals of Ulster at CELT: Corpus of Electronic Texts at University College Cork
 Annals of Tigernach at CELT: Corpus of Electronic Texts at University College Cork
Revised edition of McCarthy's synchronisms at Trinity College Dublin.

People from County Galway
People from County Roscommon
Kings of Uí Maine
William
14th-century Irish monarchs
Gaels